The Netherlands Football League Championship 1916–1917 was contested by 35 teams participating in four divisions. The national champion would be determined by a play-off featuring the winners of the eastern, northern, southern and western football division of the Netherlands. Go Ahead won this year's championship by beating UVV Utrecht, Willem II and Be Quick 1887.

New entrants
Eerste Klasse East:
Promoted from 2nd Division: SC Enschede
Eerste Klasse North: (new Division)
Achilles 1894, Be Quick 1887, Veendam, GSAVV Forward, LAC Frisia 1883, Velocitas 1897 & WVV Winschoten
Eerste Klasse South:
Promoted from 2nd Division: Zeelandia Middelburg
Eerste Klasse West:
Promoted from 2nd Division: Blauw-Wit Amsterdam

Divisions

Eerste Klasse East

Eerste Klasse North

Eerste Klasse South

Eerste Klasse West

Championship play-off

References
RSSSF Netherlands Football League Championships 1898-1954
RSSSF Eerste Klasse Oost
RSSSF Eerste Klasse Noord
RSSSF Eerste Klasse Zuid
RSSSF Eerste Klasse West

Netherlands Football League Championship seasons
1916–17 in Dutch football
Netherlands